The 2006 FIBA Stanković Continental Champions' Cup, or 2006 FIBA Stanković World Cup, was the second edition of the FIBA Stanković Continental Champions' Cup tournament. It was held in Nanjing and Kunshan, The People's Republic of China, from August 11 to 15.

Participating teams
 Australia (FIBA Oceania Champion)
 Brazil (FIBA Americas Champion)
 China (FIBA Asia Champion)
 France (FIBA Europe 2nd runner-up)
 Germany (FIBA Europe 1st runner-up)
 Greece (FIBA Europe Champion)

Teams were divided into 2 groups.

Results

Group A

11 Aug –  Greece –  Australia 68:60

12 Aug –  France –  Greece 72:68

13 Aug –  Australia –  France 77:71

A1 –  Greece

A2 –  France

A3 –  Australia

Group B

11 Aug –  Germany –  China 82:73

12 Aug –  Germany –  Brazil 76:75

13 Aug –  Brazil –  China 88:78

B1 –  Germany

B2 –  Brazil

B3 –  China

Final round

15 Aug (A3-B3)  Australia –  China 61:63

15 Aug (A2-B2)  France –  Brazil 86:74

15 Aug (A1-B1)  Greece –  Germany 84:47

Final standings

  Greece

  Germany

  France

4th  Brazil

5th  China

6th  Australia

Individual awards

All-Tournament Team
 Tony Parker ( France)
 Leandro Barbosa ( Brazil)
 Dirk Nowitzki ( Germany)
 Anderson Varejão ( Brazil)
 Yao Ming ( China)

Top Scorer
 Leandro Barbosa ( Brazil)

MVP
  Dirk Nowitzki ( Germany)

External links
Official Website

2006
2006–07 in Chinese basketball
2006–07 in Brazilian basketball
2006–07 in Australian basketball
2006–07 in French basketball
2006–07 in German basketball
2006–07 in Greek basketball